The core PatchMatch algorithm quickly finds correspondences between small square regions (or patches) of an image. The algorithm can be used in various applications such as object removal from images, reshuffling or moving contents of images, or retargeting or changing aspect ratios of images, optical flow estimation, or stereo correspondence.

Algorithm
The goal of the algorithm is to find the patch correspondence by defining a nearest-neighbor field (NNF) as a function  of offsets, which is over all possible matches of patch (location of patch centers) in image A, for some distance function of two patches . So, for a given patch coordinate  in image  and its corresponding nearest neighbor  in image ,  is simply . However, if we search for every point in image , the work will be too hard to complete. So the following algorithm is done in a randomized approach in order to accelerate the calculation speed. 
The algorithm has three main components. Initially, the nearest-neighbor field is filled with either random offsets or some prior information. Next, an iterative update process is applied to the NNF, in which good patch offsets are propagated to adjacent pixels, followed by random search in the neighborhood of the best offset found so far. Independent of these three components, the algorithm also use a coarse-to-fine approach by building an image pyramid to obtain the better result.

Initialization
When initializing with random offsets, we use independent uniform samples across the full range of image . This algorithm avoids using an initial guess from the previous level of the pyramid because in this way the algorithm can avoid being trapped in local minima.

Iteration
The iterations examine the offsets in scan order (from left to right, top to bottom), and each undergoes propagation followed by random search.

Propagation
are likely to be the same.
Alternatively, on even iterations, the algorithm search for different direction, fill the new value to be .

Random search
Let , we attempt to improve by testing a sequence of candidate offsets at an exponentially decreasing distance from 

Halting criterion
The often used halting criterion is set the iteration times to be about 4~5. Even with low iteration, the algorithm works well.

Conclusion

This is an efficient algorithm since it only takes a few second on a testing computer with Intel Core i5 CPU and Photoshop CS5.

See also

 Nearest neighbor search

References

 Connelly Barnes, Eli Shechtman, Adam Finkelstein, Dan B Goldman(2009), PatchMatch: A Randomized Correspondence Algorithm for Structural Image Editing

Computer vision